Vitaly Aleksandrovich Galkov (May 26, 1939 in Tambov – April 7, 1998 in Moscow) was a Soviet-born Russian sprint canoer who competed in the 1960s. He won the bronze medal in the C-1 1000 m event at the 1968 Summer Olympics in Mexico City.

Galkov also won a silver medal in the C-2 1000 m event at the 1963 ICF Canoe Sprint World Championships in Jajce.

External links

References

1939 births
1998 deaths
Canoeists at the 1968 Summer Olympics
Russian male canoeists
Soviet male canoeists
Olympic canoeists of the Soviet Union
Olympic bronze medalists for the Soviet Union
Olympic medalists in canoeing
ICF Canoe Sprint World Championships medalists in Canadian
Sportspeople from Tambov
Medalists at the 1968 Summer Olympics